Agartala–Dharmanagar Passenger is a Passenger train belonging to Northeast Frontier Railway zone that runs between  and . It is currently being operated with 05675/05676 train numbers on a daily basis.

Average speed and frequency 

The 05675/Agartala–Dharmanagar Passenger runs with an average speed of 33 km/h and completes 139 km in 4h 15m. The 05676/Dharmanagar–Agartala Passenger runs with an average speed of 35 km/h and completes 139 km in 4h.

Route and halts 

The important halts of the train are:

Coach composite 

The train has standard ICF rakes with max speed of 110 kmph. The train consists of 21 coaches:

 1 AC III Tier
 1 Sleeper class
 1 Second Sitting
 6 General Unreserved
 2 High capacity parcel 
 2 Seating cum Luggage Rake

Traction

Both trains are hauled by a Siliguri Loco Shed-based WDP-4 diesel locomotive from Agartala to Dharmanagar and vice versa.

See also 

 Agartala railway station
 Dharmanagar railway station
 Agartala–Silchar Passenger

Notes

References

External links 

 55675/Agartala–Dharmanagar Passenger India Rail Info
 55676/Dharmanagar–Agartala Passenger India Rail Info

Transport in Agartala
Rail transport in Tripura
Slow and fast passenger trains in India
Railway services introduced in 2015